3 Pill Morning (sometimes stylized as 3PM) is an American rock / hard rock band from Minneapolis, formed in 2004. The band consists of Jeff Stebbins (vocals), Gary Pahl II (guitar), Ryan Lee (bass) and Steven Starks Jr. (drums). On October 1, 2008, the band released their debut album "The Side Effects of Chronic Ambition" independently. Their first radio single, "Loser", spawned from their EP "Take Control" and stayed in rotation on the Top 100 chart on Active Radio in the US for over 6 months in 2011. On July 17, 2012, the band released their sophomore full-length studio album entitled "Black Tie Love Affair" on Page 2 Music distributed by eOne. The music video for "Skin" was officially released on July 5, 2012. The band's latest album "Never Look Back" was released on July 29, 2016 on Countdown Entertainment distributed by The Fuel Music. The album recognized as the Billboard #15 Hard Rock Albums and #14 Heatseekers Albums for that week.

Tours
 Exhale Tour with Thousand Foot Krutch and Adelitas Way Summer of 2016
 "Electric Tour" Headline Tour Spring 2016 in support of new radio single Electric Chair.
 Toured with In This Moment, Starset and Twelve Foot Ninja Winter of 2014
 Toured with Theory of a Deadman, Fozzy, Blackstone Cherry Fall of 2014
 Toured with and opened for 12 Stones in North Dakota and the Midwest in the Fall of 2012.
 Toured with Hollywood Undead and Escape the Fate on the House Of Blues tour in the summer of 2013.
 Opened for Shinedown and In This Moment on select dates in Nebraska in the summer of 2012.
 Supporting act on tour in summer 2012, with Sevendust.
 Through February and March 2012, they toured with Rains.
 Opening for Saving Abel in mid-August 2012 at the Northwoods Rock Rally.
 They played shows with Hurt and Smile Empty Soul in May and June 2012.
 In September 2011 the Armed Forces Entertainment hosted the band at the Thule Air Base in Greenland.
 North American tour with Buckcherry in 2014.

Band members

Current members
Jeff Stebbins  – Vocals
Gary Pahl II  – Guitar
Ryan Lee – Bass, Backing vocals
Steven Starks Jr. – Drums, Percussion

Former members
Jason Hanson
Aaron Peterson
Adam Seiberlich
Ryan Walch
Dave Ackley
Ian Combs
Jeremy Moore
Charlie Thompson
Kyle Glidden
Matt Burke
Dan Schroeder
Trent Laugerman
Jon Stephenson

Discography

Studio albums

EPs
 Take Control (2011)
 Life Dynamic (2006)
 Clarity (2004)
 The Product (2003)

Singles
"Rain"
"Skin"
"Loser"
"I Want That For You"
"Electric Chair"
"The Queen"
"Never Look Back"

References

External links
Official Website
Facebook page

American pop rock music groups